Rush Bullis (June 10, 1863 – August 16, 1946) was an American farmer and politician.

Born in Milton Junction, Wisconsin, Bullis was a dairy farmer in the town of Washington, Eau Claire, Wisconsin. Bullis first came to the Eau Claire area in 1907.  He served as chairman of the town of Washington from 1913 to 1918. In 1919 and 1921, Bullis served in the Wisconsin State Assembly and was a Republican. Bullis died in a hospital in Eau Claire, Wisconsin. He was married to Bertha Burtz in 1888, and they had four children.

Notes

External links

1863 births
1946 deaths
People from Eau Claire County, Wisconsin
People from Milton, Wisconsin
Farmers from Wisconsin
Mayors of places in Wisconsin
Republican Party members of the Wisconsin State Assembly
Dairy farmers